Colin Stuart (born July 8, 1982) is an American former professional ice hockey winger. He played with the Atlanta Thrashers and Buffalo Sabres in the National Hockey League. He is the older brother of Mark Stuart and Mike Stuart, and is the son of Mayo Clinic physician Michael Stuart.

Playing career
Stuart was drafted in the NHL by the Atlanta Thrashers with the 135th pick in the 2001 NHL Entry Draft from Colorado College.  He joined the Thrashers organization in 2004 and was assigned to the American Hockey League's Chicago Wolves as well as playing five games for the ECHL's Gwinnett Gladiators.  After two more seasons with the Wolves, Stuart made his NHL debut during the 2007–08 NHL season, playing 18 games and scoring 3 goals.  He returned to the Wolves shortly afterwards and won the Calder Cup.

On July 1, 2009 Stuart was traded to the Toronto Maple Leafs along with Garnet Exelby for Pavel Kubina and the rights to Tim Stapleton. He was then shipped to the Calgary Flames on July 27, 2009 in the trade that brought Wayne Primeau to Toronto.

On July 7, 2011, Stuart re-signed with the Buffalo Sabres on a one-year contract.

On September 18, 2012, Stuart left North America as a free agent to sign with the Iserlohn Roosters in the Deutsche Eishockey Liga for one-year. During the 2012–13 season, Stuart established himself amongst the Roosters leadership group, and contributed with 21 points in 45 games.

On July 25, 2013, Stuart opted to return to the NHL and signed a one-year, two-way contract with the Vancouver Canucks. He was assigned to AHL inaugural affiliate, the Utica Comets, for the 2013–14 season, scoring 25 points in 54 games.

Stuart opted to continue his European career in the off-season, in signing a one-year deal with the  Malmö Redhawks of the Swedish HockeyAllsvenskan on August 14, 2014. Mid-season, Stuart opted to leave Sweden and return to North America, signing in the AHL with the Providence Bruins.

On August 30, 2015, Stuart announced the end of his professional career after 11 seasons.

Career statistics

Regular season and playoffs

International

Awards and honors

References

External links

1982 births
Living people
Abbotsford Heat players
American men's ice hockey left wingers
Atlanta Thrashers draft picks
Atlanta Thrashers players
Buffalo Sabres players
Chicago Wolves players
Colorado College Tigers men's ice hockey players
Gwinnett Gladiators players
Ice hockey players from Minnesota
Iserlohn Roosters players
Lincoln Stars players
Malmö Redhawks players
Portland Pirates players
Providence Bruins players
Rochester Americans players
Sportspeople from Rochester, Minnesota
Stuart family
Utica Comets players